The Socolar–Taylor tile is a single non-connected tile which is aperiodic on the Euclidean plane, meaning that it admits only non-periodic tilings of the plane (due to the Sierpinski's triangle-like tiling that occurs), with rotations and reflections of the tile allowed. It is the first known example of a single aperiodic tile, or "einstein". The basic version of the tile is a simple hexagon, with printed designs to enforce a local matching rule, regarding how the tiles may be placed. It is currently unknown whether this rule may be geometrically implemented in two dimensions while keeping the tile a connected set.

This is, however, confirmed to be possible in three dimensions, and, in their original paper, Socolar and Taylor suggest a three-dimensional analogue to the monotile. Taylor and Socolar remark that the 3D monotile aperiodically tiles three-dimensional space. However the tile does allow tilings with a period, shifting one (non-periodic) two dimensional layer to the next, and so the tile is only "weakly aperiodic".

Physical copies of the three-dimensional tile could not be fitted together without allowing reflections, which would require  access to four-dimensional space.

Gallery

References

External links
Previewable digital models of the three-dimensional tile, suitable for 3D printing, at Thingiverse
Original diagrams and further information on Joan Taylor's personal website

Aperiodic tilings